The Duma of Stavropol Krai, formerly the State Duma of Stavropol Krai until 2010, is the regional parliament of Stavropol Krai, a federal subject of Russia. It consists of 50 deputies elected for five-year terms.

Elections

2021

Notes

References 

Politics of Stavropol Krai
Stavropol Krai